Mohamed Abdul Rahman may refer to:

 Mohamed bin Abdul Rahman (born 1935), Malaysian sprinter
 Mohamed Abdul Rahman (sport shooter), Bahraini shooter